Luis Victoriano García (born May 16, 2000) is a Dominican American professional baseball infielder for the Washington Nationals of Major League Baseball (MLB).

Early life
García's father, Luis Rafael García, is a Dominican-born shortstop who briefly reached the major leagues with the Detroit Tigers during their 1999 season. Luis Victoriano García was born in New York City, but he moved to the Dominican Republic at the age of 3. At the age of 16, despite being a U.S. citizen, he signed a contract with the Nationals on July 2, 2016, as an international free agent out of the Dominican Republic.

Professional career
When he signed with the Nationals in 2016, García accepted a $1.3 million signing bonus, the second-most the Nationals awarded an international player in the 2016 class behind fellow Dominican shortstop Yasel Antuna.

Baseball America ranked García as the Nationals' seventh-best prospect before the 2017 season. García made his professional debut in 2017 with the Gulf Coast League Nationals, appearing as both a second baseman and shortstop during the season and often forming the GCL Nationals' double-play tandem with Antuna. Both players put up batting averages slightly above .300, with García's the better of the two at .302, during their 2017 campaigns. García advanced quickly in the 2018 season, earning a midseason promotion from the Class-A Hagerstown Suns to the High-A Potomac Nationals, and he was the youngest player and the first ever born in the 2000s selected to the All-Star Futures Game in 2018, playing for Team World against fellow Nationals infield prospect Carter Kieboom and Team USA.

García was the youngest player invited to participate in a major league spring training camp in 2019, with the Nationals. He was one of eleven Nationals prospects who played for the Surprise Saguaros in the Arizona Fall League that year, driving in the Saguaros' only run in the championship game versus the Salt River Rafters on October 25, 2019.

On August 14, 2020, García's contract was selected to the major leagues and he made his debut that day against the Baltimore Orioles, filling in for the injured Starlin Castro. Three days later, he became the first MLB player born in the 2000s to hit a home run. Coincidentally, Castro, who he replaced due to injury, was the first MLB player born in the 1990s to hit a home run.  García finished his rookie season hitting .276/.302/.366 in 40 games.

On April 6, 2021, García was called up briefly before being optioned back to the Nationals alternate training site on April 12th. He was assigned to the AAA Rochester Red Wings 1 day before the minor league season began, on May 3, 2021. He was called up again on May 25, appearing in 2 games at the major league level before being sent back down on May 30. He was recalled yet again on June 16, staying in the majors for just 4 days before returning to Rochester.

García was called up for a 4th time during the season on July 29, 2021. He became the Nationals everyday second baseman, following the trades of infielders Josh Harrison and Trea Turner as well as the suspension and subsequent release of Starlin Castro. He finished 2021 slashing .303/.371/.599 in 37 games at the AAA level and .242/.275/.411 in 70 games in the MLB.

García once again began the 2022 season at AAA Rochester. He hit 8 HR along with 32 RBI in 42 games before joining the Nationals on June 1. He recorded his 10th career home run on June 15.

See also

 List of Dominican Americans
 List of Major League Baseball players from the Dominican Republic
 List of people from New York City
 List of second-generation Major League Baseball players

References

External links

2000 births
Living people
American sportspeople of Dominican Republic descent
Gulf Coast Nationals players
Hagerstown Suns players
Harrisburg Senators players
Major League Baseball second basemen
Major League Baseball players from the Dominican Republic
Potomac Nationals players
Rochester Red Wings players
Baseball players from New York City
Surprise Saguaros players
Washington Nationals players